Drybrook Rugby Club is an English rugby union club based in Drybrook, Gloucestershire. The first XV team currently plays in Regional 1 South West, having reached the national levels of the sport for the first time in 2018.

Honours
Gloucestershire 1 champions: 1988–89
Gloucester Premier champions (3): 2002–03, 2008–09, 2012–13
Western Counties North champions: 2013–14
South West 1 West champions: 2017–18

References

English rugby union teams
Rugby union in Gloucestershire
Sports clubs in England